James Laidlaw (July 7, 1822 – March 3, 1905) was a Canadian farmer and politician. He represented Wellington South in the Legislative Assembly of Ontario as a Liberal member from 1879 to 1886.

He was born in Roxburghshire, Scotland in 1822 and came to Guelph, Upper Canada with his family in 1831. In 1848, he married Mary Beattie. He served on the council for Guelph Township, also serving as reeve and warden for Wellington County. Laidlaw served as manager for the Government farm and Agriculture College at Guelph in 1875.

External links 

The Canadian parliamentary companion, 1885 JA Gemmill
Excerpt from Historical Atlas of the County of Wellington, Ontario (1906)

1822 births
1905 deaths
Ontario Liberal Party MPPs
People from Roxburgh
Scottish emigrants to pre-Confederation Ontario